Jijegyo (in Hangul:지제교, in Hanja:知製敎) is the terminology of an official position during Joseon dynasty. Jijegyo basically works on behalf of king's edict, degree or command. Its initial beginning was Goryeo when the title was Jijego(지제고, 知制誥). After Goryo demolished, Joseon designated two organs of personnel;officers of Seungjeongwon and Saganwon for Inner Jijegyo and other ten subjects elected called as outer Jijegyo.

Sejong the Great later permitted bachelors of Jiphyeonjeon to take hold of outer jijegyo altogether with their original duty, whereas in 1430, he again transformed the guideline, which allowed bachelors to be inner jijegyo, with personnel of outer jijegyo being elected as the same way as before.

Since Jinhyeojeon had gone through innovative doctrine with establishment of Hongmungwan, the personnel of Hongmungwan came to hold 13 seats of jijegyo simultaneously, whereas another officers were elected in a separate division. By late 18th century, the meaning of inner jijegyo became shifted, in that the term indicated the case that one holds not only a position of Hongmungwan but also takes jijegyo, concurrently.

See also
 Joseon dynasty
 Jeong Do-jeon
Joseon Dynasty politics

References
 Portals of Korean Archive Accessed on 2012-02-13
 Jijegyo
 The Academy of Korean Studies - Search list
 Document of edicts and Jijegyo Museum directory

External links
 Edicts National heritage archive of Korea
 Appointment as jijegyo

Joseon dynasty